Vesela Hora is an village in the Kramatorsk Raion, Donetsk Oblast (province) of eastern Ukraine.  It is part of Novodonetske settlement hromada, one of the hromadas of Ukraine.

Until 18 July 2020, Vesela Hora was located in Oleksandrivka Raion, The raion was abolished on that day as part of the administrative reform of Ukraine, which reduced the number of raions of Donetsk Oblast to eight, of which only five were controlled by the government.

References

Villages in Kramatorsk Raion
Kramatorsk Raion